Aougrout District is a district of Timimoun Province, Algeria. According to the 2008 census it has a population of 28,869.

Communes
The district is further divided into 3 communes:
Aougrout
Deldoul
Metarfa

References

Districts of Adrar Province